G.S Jayalal is an Indian politician and social worker who is a member of  13th Kerala Legislative Assembly representing  Chathannoor assembly constituency. He is a member of the Communist Party of India and has served as member of part State Council.

Early life and education 
He was born as the son of S. Gopala Krishna Pillai and Sathibai on 20 May 1972 at Chirakkara of Kollam district. After attending Chirakkara Government High School, G.S. Jayalal earned his SSLC in 1987. Gopalakrishna Pillai, his father, served as vice president of the Kalluvathukkal panchayat and is one of the Communist Party's Chathannoor constituency leaders.

Personal life
His wife R.S. Preetha is an LIC Insurance agent. The couple has two children Ardra P Lal, Advait Krishna.

Positions Held 

 Elected to Kerala Legislative Assembly in 2011 & 2016 from Chathannoor (Assembly constituency)
 Communist Party of India, Kerala state council member
 Communist Party of India, Kollam district council member
 State President, All Kerala Water Authority Employees Union (A.I.T.U.C.)
 Secretary of the AYF Chathannoor
 Vice-President, Kollam Co-operative Spinning Mill Employees Union

Assembly election candidature history

Controversies 
In 2019, G.S Jayalal faced allegations related to hospital purchase without the party's consent.

The Swanthanam Cooperative Hospital Society with Jayalal as president had signed an agreement to purchase Ashtamudi Hospital at Kollam . An agreement has also been signed to pay advance without seeking permission of the party.

Criticisms against the move by Mr. Jayalal intensified pointing out that the deal has been made even as the C. Achutha Menon Cooperative Hospital run by the party's district committee remains shut for the past several months due to lack of funds. Communist Party of India found lapse in Jayalal's action and recommended disciplinary actions for  performing a deal without the knowledge of party.

References 

1972 births
Living people
Members of the Kerala Legislative Assembly
Communist Party of India politicians from Kerala
People from Kollam district